The Values Union is a German registered association that considers itself to be a "conservative grassroots movement" within the Christian Democratic Union of Germany and the Christian Social Union in Bavaria, collectively known as the Union. It has been described as Germany's Tea Party. The Values Union is no official party affiliation and its role within the Union parties is highly controversial. It was founded in 2017 and has around 4,000 official members. In the 2018 leadership election the Values Union announced its support for Friedrich Merz.

Structure
Federal presidency:

 Alexander Mitsch (March 2017 – May 2021)
 Max Otte (May 2021 – January 2022)

Former members:

 Alexander Mitsch, co-founder and first federal president of Values Union

Hans-Georg Maaßen, former President of the Federal Office for the Protection of the Constitution
 Werner Josef Patzelt, political scientist and university professor

References

External links
  (in German)

Conservatism in Germany
Christian Democratic Union of Germany
Climate change denial
Populism
Organisations based in Baden-Württemberg
Political organizations established in 2017
Political party factions in Germany